WPLT (106.3 MHz) is an FM radio station broadcasting a country music format. Licensed to Sarona, Wisconsin, United States.  The station is owned by Zoe Communications.

History
This station received its original construction permit from the Federal Communications Commission on August 10, 2000.  The new station was assigned the WPLT call sign by the FCC on June 15, 2001.  WPLT received its license to cover from the FCC on November 12, 2003.

WPLT uses a directional antenna to prevent interference to short spaced WEVR-FM.

WPLT is also a former call sign of what is now WDVD 96.3 FM in Detroit, Michigan.

References

External links

PLT
Country radio stations in the United States
Radio stations established in 2003